The ICAR Canned Beef Monument is a public outdoor sculpture in Sarajevo.

A memorial to the food aid delivered during the Siege of Sarajevo, the inscription on the plinth is "Monument to the International Community by the grateful citizens of Sarajevo". However, in the opinion of the monument's creators, the aid was of the wrong kind: barely-edible canned food, instead of weapons. Some food was left over from the Vietnam War and over 20 years expired, some consisted of pork for the half-Muslim country, and in popular legend refused by dogs and cats.

The sculpture is located on a walking path that runs behind the Historical Museum of Bosnia and Herzegovina toward the Miljacka River. Designed by Nebojsa Seric Shoba, it is a large representation of a can of beef (a common food supplied during the siege by international organizations), sculpted from painted steel on a marble plinth. It was dedicated on April 6, 2007.

Since its dedication it has become graffitied and some paint has peeled.
In July 2022 the label on the can was updated and attached. The new label gives credit to the Netherlands for their contributions to the situation, and eliminates the graffiti and wear that had previously been evident.

See also
Culture of Sarajevo

References

Culture in Sarajevo
Outdoor sculptures
European sculpture
2007 sculptures
Steel sculptures
Pop art